The 1979 Arizona Republic / Jimmy Bryan 150 was the first round of the 1979 IndyCar season, held on March 11, at Phoenix International Raceway, Avondale, Arizona. It marked the debut of the new Championship Automobile Racing Teams, or CART, era of IndyCar racing.

Race

Summary 
In the inaugural race for the new series, Bobby Unser won the pole with Tom Sneva starting in second. Johnny Rutherford started third, Danny Ongais started fourth, and Rick Mears rounded out the top five starters.

From his pole position, Bobby Unser led almost all of the first 86 laps, only giving up the lead for pit stops. The first caution of the day flew on lap 2, after Vern Schuppan broke a joint and went off track in the first turn. The second caution flew due to a stalled car at lap 15, and the third due to debris picked up when Gordon Johncock left the pits on lap 69. After Unser was forced to make an unscheduled pit stop due to tire problems, Danny Ongais took the lead on lap 87, and held it for the next 33 laps, but soon after giving up the lead to Johncock retired with a blown engine, bringing out the final caution of the day. Johncock went on to win the race, with Rick Mears finishing second, Johnny Rutherford third, Al Unser fourth, and Bobby Unser rounding out the top five.

There was some confusion in the final few laps, with Al Unser listed as running higher than he actually was.

Results

Caution flag breakdown 

16.7% of race run under caution.

Lap leader breakdown

Points standings after this race 
Note: Only the top ten positions are listed.

References

External links 
 Full Weekend Times & Results
 racing-reference

Arizona Republic Jimmy Bryan 150, 1979
Arizona Republic Jimmy Bryan 150
Arizona Republic Jimmy Bryan 150